Winter Boy is a French drama film, directed by Christophe Honoré and released in 2022. The film stars Paul Kircher as Lucas, a gay teenager coping with the sudden and unexpected death of his father in an accident that may or may not have been suicide.

The film's cast also includes Juliette Binoche as Lucas's mother Isabelle, Vincent Lacoste as his older brother Quentin, Adrien Casse as his boyfriend Oscar and Honoré himself as the father, as well as Xavier Giannoli, Pascal Cervo, Wilfried Capet, Jean-Philippe Salerio, Erwan Kepoa Falé, Anne Kessler and Isabelle Thevenoux in supporting roles.

The film premiered in the Contemporary World Cinema program at the 2022 Toronto International Film Festival, and screened in competition at the 70th San Sebastián International Film Festival.

Accolades 

|-
| align = "center" | 2022 || 70th San Sebastián International Film Festival || Silver Shell for Best Leading Performance || Paul Kircher ||  || 
|}

References

External links

2022 films
2022 drama films
2022 LGBT-related films
French drama films
French LGBT-related films
LGBT-related drama films
Films directed by Christophe Honoré
2020s French-language films
2020s French films